The 2022–23 Ohio State Buckeyes men's ice hockey season is the 60th season of play for the program. They will represent the Ohio State University in the 2022–23 NCAA Division I men's ice hockey season. This season will mark the 10th in the Big Ten Conference. The Buckeyes are coached by Steve Rohlik, in his 10th season, and play their home games at Value City Arena.

Season
During the game against Michigan State on November 11, Kamil Sadlocha was given a game misconduct for yelling a racial slur at Jagger Joshua. The Big Ten supported the match penalty but, due to a lack of incontrovertible evidence, would not add any additional punishment. Because of the lack of action from either Ohio State or the Big Ten, Joshua went public with the incident a week later. Though Jagger did not name the offending player, Sadlocha was the only one to receive a match penalty in the game. After the full account of the incident was reported, the Ohio State athletic department sent Sadlocha home for an indeterminate time.

Departures

Recruiting

Roster
As of July 21, 2022.

Standings

Schedule and results

|-
!colspan=12 style=";" | Regular Season

|-
!colspan=12 style=";" | 

|-
!colspan=12 style=";" |

Scoring statistics

Goaltending statistics

Rankings

USCHO did not release a poll in weeks 1 and 13.

References

External links

2022-23
Ohio State Buckeyes
Ohio State Buckeyes
Ohio State Buckeyes
Ohio State Buckeyes